Per Sverre Kvinlaug (born 13 December 1974) is a Norwegian politician for the Christian Democratic Party.

He served as a deputy representative to the Parliament of Norway from Vest-Agder during the terms 2013–2017 and 2017–2021. He hails from Kvinesdal and was elected mayor in 2015.

References

1974 births
Living people
People from Kvinesdal
Deputy members of the Storting
Christian Democratic Party (Norway) politicians
Mayors of places in Vest-Agder